Heteromicta pachytera is a species of moth of the family Pyralidae. It is found in Australia, including Queensland, New South Wales, Victoria, South Australia and Tasmania.

The wingspan is about 20 mm. The forewings have a grey pattern.

References

Moths described in 1880
Moths of Australia
Tirathabini